"The Naval Treaty" is the third episode of the series The Adventures of Sherlock Holmes, the first series in the Sherlock Holmes series which is based on Sir Arthur Conan Doyle stories. The series was produced by the British television company Granada Television between 1984 and 1994 and star Jeremy Brett as the famous detective. "The Naval Treaty" is based on the short story "The Adventure of the Naval Treaty". The episode first aired on 8 May 1984.

Plot

Briarbrae House 
The episode opens on a rainy night. A frantically crying man (Percy Phelps) is carried into his home by a few men while his fiancée (Annie) and her brother (Joseph Harrison) watch over him worriedly. The titles follow.
The scene changes to the drawing room at the residence of Sherlock Holmes and Dr. Watson at 221B Baker Street Holmes is busy with a chemical experiment pertaining to a case he is investigating when Dr. Watson enters the room with a letter he has received from his childhood friend, a senior at school and a brilliant academician, Percy Phelps. Holmes reads the letter handed to him by Dr. Watson in which Percy states that after completing his education he obtained an appointment at the Foreign Office where he was able to win a position of trust and honor, and that a misfortune has occurred which has ruined his career and reputation. He requests Dr. Watson to get Holmes to meet him so that he may get his assistance in the matter. Holmes deduces from the writing that it is of a woman and that she is of an exceptional nature, and agrees to accompany Dr. Watson to Phelps’ home, Briarbrae House in Woking.

Scene changes to the garden of Briarbrae House where Joseph Harrison comes across Holmes and Dr. Watson as they are walking in. Holmes deduces from the monogram on Harrison's jacket chain that he is not a member of Phelps family. Inside the house, in Phelps’ sick room Holmes and Dr. Watson are greeted by Phelps himself and his fiancée Annie by his bed side.

Theft of the treaty
The scene changes to Lord Holdhurst's office as Phelps starts narrating the incidents of the evening of 23 May, when he was summoned by Lord Holdhurst in his office. Lord Holdhurst entrusts Phelps with the task of creating a copy of a document - a naval treaty signed between England and Italy, written  in  French - at the time the  common language of European diplomacy. He also tells Phelps that the job has to be done very carefully and while making sure that the contents are not leaked, as the Russian and French embassies are out to pay an immense sum of money to know the contents of the document. He suggests Percy to stay back after office, so that everyone has left and then work on copying the document and specifically asks him to keep both the original document and the copy locked in his desk drawer and hand it over to personally the next morning.

In answer to Holmes question as to the nature of the document, Percy tells him that the document defines the position of Great Britain towards the triple alliance in the event of the French fleet gaining ascendency over Italy in the Mediterranean. Phelps returns to his office, waits till his colleague Charles Gorot leaves for the day and then starts copying the document page by page.

Back in the present times, Phelps tells Holmes that that evening he intended to join Harrison on the 11’O clock train back to Woking but was not able to, because the document, written in French, was very long. 
Scene changes back to Phelps’ office where, after a while of working on the document, Phelps rings the bell to summon commissionaire to get him a cup of coffee. The bell is answered by a woman who says he is the commissionaire's wife. She leaves after saying she will wake the commissionaire to prepare the coffee. Phelps resumes working on the document but since the coffee does not arrive for a while, leaves his room, with the original and the half-finished copy on his desk, to go down and check on the commissionaire. He finds that the commissionaire had dozed off and while he is apologizing for that, to both their surprise, a bell rings in the commissionaire's room. The commissionaire is confused as to the ringing of the bell and upon asking tells Phelps that that bell is from the room in which he was working. Phelps, realizing that the documents are lying unprotected on his desk, rushes up the stairs to his room and finds that the original document has disappeared from his desk.

Back in the present time, Phelps tells Holmes that he did not pass anyone on the stairs while going up. He gets upset and breathless out of anxiety, while narrating the incident. While Watson reviews a rough chart of the building that Phelps has drawn, Phelps goes on to state there are two stairs that lead up to Phelps’ office, and since he went up using one of those stairs when he heard the bell and didn't meet anyone on his way up, the thief must have used the other staircase that opened up on Charles street, and that it was impossible for the thief to lay concealed anywhere in the passageway and all the other doors were locked. Phelps tells Holmes that he distinctly remembers hearing the three quarters of the Big Ben, indicating that the time was quarter to 10.

He tells Holmes that he and the commissionaire took the other stair and went out on Charles Street but it was raining (since 7 that evening) and there was no one to be seen on the street. A policeman who they met around the corner tells them that hasn't seen leave the building for a quarter of an hour except the commissionaire's wife.

Phelps relapses into a bout of breathlessness while talking and they have to leave him to rest for a while. Meanwhile, Holmes asks Joseph Harrison about his occupation and finds out that as the eldest son, he is expecting to inherit his father's business and that he also doubles in stocks and shares. Harrison tells him that he was not planning on meeting Phelps on the evening of the incident, and that he did not know of Phelps intention of joining him on the train back to Woking.

Phelps continues his narrative after he is feeling better. He tells them that after discovering the theft they search the commissionaire's home (since his wife was seen leaving the building around the time the theft occurred) but find no trace of the document. Phelps says that he has no recollection of what happened after this since he was delirious and was escorted to his home by a doctor living in his neighbourhood and who was fortunately traveling by the same train as the one to be taken by Phelps at the time (the 11.40 train to Woking).

Investigations at the Foreign Office
Holmes and Watson discuss the matter among themselves as they walk to a cab which they take to the Foreign Office. In the Foreign Office, they meet Inspector Forbes, who tells them they have cleared both Tangier, the commissionaire and Gorot, Phelps colleague. He admits that he has no idea who rang the bell and why. Holmes and Watson then meet Lord Holdurst in his office where he tells them that he is certain no one overheard him giving Phelps instructions about the document and that no one even knew of the task assigned to him. With this information Holmes deduces that the person who took the document from Phelps’ office, came across it unexpectedly. In answer Holmes’ question as to whether the effects of the leakage of the contents of the document have been seen, Lord Holdhurst replies that he hasn't seen any such effects and says that he would certainly get to know if any of the agencies were to get to know about the document.

Back at Baker Street, Holmes tells Watson that he intends to do nothing more that evening unless he got an answer to the cab enquiry he has made to know if any cab driver left any one at or near the Foreign Office on the evening of the incident.

Burglary at Briarbrae House &  Holmes' plan
At Briarbrae House, Phelps refuses to take his sleep medication and tells Annie that he will sleep without medication as he has got new hope since Holmes has taken up the case. As Phelps is sleeping without his medication, he is woken up later that night to see the silhouette of someone trying to enter his room through the window. Noticing that Phelps is awake, the person flees before he is able to take a look at the face.
The next morning Phelps informs Holmes and Watson of the intrusion from the previous night. While Watson, Harrison and Phelps are outside discussing the matter, Holmes rushes to talk to Annie who is sitting in Phelps’ sick room and tells her to enact a plan that evening. He asks her to remain in the same room all day and to lock the room from the outside when she leaves to go to bed. He then asks Phelps to come with him and Watson to London and spend the night there.

On their way to Woking station, Holmes suddenly gets out of the carriage after giving Watson instructions to take Phelps to Baker Street and remaining there and tells them that he expects to join them at Baker Street by breakfast time the next morning.

Holmes spends the day in the countryside and returns to Briarbrae later in the evening and sees Annie still in Phelps room, reading.

Holmes' nocturnal adventures at Briarbrae House 
Scene changes to Baker Street and it is the morning of the following day. Holmes has returned as expected and there is a handkerchief tied to his left hand, presumably because he has hurt himself. Mrs. Hudson brings in the breakfast in a tray of covered dishes. Phelps refuses to eat anything but Holmes asks him to help him by serving him some breakfast since his hand is hurt. Phelps lifts the lid off a dish and finds, to his immense surprise and joy, a scroll of paper which turns out to be the stolen treaty.

Holmes, while eating his breakfast tells Phelps and Watson that the previous night he waited outside Phelps' window while Annie locks the door as instructed and leaves to go to bed. Later that night a person sneaks into the room through the window and Holmes follows the person inside. It is revealed that he person is Harrison. He has crept into the room to retrieve the document which he has hidden in underside of the sofa. After a struggle between the two, in which Holmes’ hand is injured by Harrison's knife, Harrison escapes the scene. 
Watson is surprised that Holmes let Harrison get away, but Holmes tells him that he has wired Harrison's details to the police, but also says that it is better for Lord Holdhurst and Phelps’ sake that he is not caught and that the matter never reaches the police court.

Holmes says that Harrison was under heavy debt due to the money he lost in the stock market, giving him the motive for the theft. On the night of the theft, as Harrison got free earlier than expected he goes to Phelps’ office intending to join him on the return train. He goes in by the side entrance (the one that opens up on Charles Street) and seeing no one in Phelps’ room rings the bell. But after he rings the bell, he sees the treaty on the desk and realises that it is very important state document. So he steals it, goes back to Woking and stores it in the underside of the sofa in his room, intending to sell it at a later time. Just as he finishes hiding the document, Phelps’ voice is heard outside the house as he is brought home in a delirious state.

Harrison has to move out of his room as it is turned into a sick room for Phelps, and since after that time there is always someone present in the room, he is not able to retrieve the document. Holmes reasons that since the attempt to break in was made on the same night that the hired nurse was not present in Phelps’ room, the person must have been someone who knew the household well and hence knew that the nurse would be not be present in the room that night. But since Phelps had slept very lightly that night due to not having taken his sleeping draught, the attempt failed.

Holmes explains further that on the previous day he increased Harrison's anticipation by asking Annie to stay in the room all day. By following him into the room later that night, he allows Harrison himself to show him the hiding place of the document instead of having to rip up the whole room searching for it. In reply to Watson's question as to why Harrison used the window instead of the door to enter the room, Holmes says that he did that to make it look like the job of a burglar and if necessary effect an escape across the courtyard.

Cast 
 Jeremy Brett – Sherlock Holmes
 David Burke – Dr. Watson
 David Gwillim – Percy Phelps
 Gareth Thomas – Joseph Harrison
 Alison Skilbeck – Annie Harrison
 Ronald Russell – Lord Holdhurst
 Nicholas Geake – Charles Gorot
 Pamela Pitchford – Mrs. Tangey
 John Malcolm – Tangey
 David Rodigan – Inspector Forbes
 Eve Matheson – Miss Tangey
 Rosalie Williams – Mrs. Hudson
 John Taylor – Dr. Ferrier

See also
List of Sherlock Holmes episodes

References

External links

Disney Channel original programming
Period television series
1984 British television episodes